Flawless Records was a record label formed by Limp Bizkit frontman Fred Durst as a division of Geffen Records. It has signed such bands as Puddle of Mudd, The Revolution Smile, and Ringside.

Artists
Past
Big Dumb Face
Kenna
Puddle of Mudd
She Wants Revenge
The Revolution Smile
Ringside
Sinisstar

Flawless Releases
The Family Values Tour 1999 (Various Artists) (5/23/00)
Big Dumb Face – Duke Lion Fights the Terror (3/6/01)
Puddle of Mudd – Come Clean (8/28/01)
The Revolution Smile – We Are in This Alone (5/8/03) (Not Available)
The Revolution Smile – Above the Noise (7/29/03)
Puddle of Mudd – Life on Display (11/25/03)
Ringside – Ringside (4/19/05)
Puddle of Mudd – Famous (10/9/07)
Puddle of Mudd – Volume 4: Songs in the Key of Love and Hate (12/8/09)

See also 
 List of record labels

Defunct record labels of the United States
American record labels
Vanity record labels
Alternative rock record labels
Labels distributed by Universal Music Group